The following is a list of stripped medals at the European Athletics Championships.

IAAF Rule 32.2.a
RULE 32 - Anti-Doping Rule Violations
1. Doping is defined as the occurrence of one or more of the anti-doping rule violations set out in Rule 32.2 of these Anti-Doping Rules.
2. Athletes or other Persons shall be responsible for knowing what constitutes an anti-doping rule violation and the substances and methods which have been included on the Prohibited List. The following constitute anti-doping rule violations:
(a) Presence of a Prohibited Substance or its Metabolites or Markers in an Athlete’s Sample.

Stripped of European Championships medals

2010 Barcelona
At the 2010 European Athletics Championships 14 medals was stripped, 3 men and 11 women.

2012 Helsinki
At the 2012 European Athletics Championships 9 medals were stripped, 1 man and 8 women.

2014 Zürich
At the 2014 European Athletics Championships 1 medals was stripped, 1 men and 0 women.

2016 Amsterdam
At the 2016 European Athletics Championships 0 medals was stripped as of 29 August 2018.

2018 Berlin
At the 2018 European Athletics Championships 0 medals was stripped as of 29 August 2018.

See also
 List of doping cases in athletics
 List of stripped Olympic medals
 Doping at the World Championships in Athletics

References

External links
 European Athletics Championships History at EAA web site

+European Athletics
European Athletics
Doping
Europe sport-related lists